Maureen O'Neil  was made an Officer of the Order of Canada in 2011 in recognition for "her contributions to international development, gender equality and human rights". She is the President of the Canadian Foundation for Healthcare Improvement. She has previously served as President of the International Development Research Centre, President of the North-South Institute, and Ontario Deputy Minister of Citizenship.

References

[UN http://www.unrisd.org/80256B3C005BE6B5/(httpNews)/548B34B678080CF0C125794A00348862?OpenDocument]

[CHSRF http://www.chsrf.ca/newsandevents/Bios/MaureenONeil.aspx]
[UN 2http://www.unrisd.org/80256B3C005BE6B5/(httpNews)/548B34B678080CF0C125794A00348862?OpenDocument]
[Queens http://www.queensu.ca/sps/facultyresearch/fellows/oneilm.html]

21st-century Canadian civil servants
21st-century Canadian women
Canadian women civil servants
Carleton University alumni
Living people
Officers of the Order of Canada
Ontario civil servants
People in international development
Year of birth missing (living people)